The Sulawesi tiny shrew (Crocidura levicula) is a species of mammal in the family Soricidae. It is endemic to the island of Sulawesi in Indonesia.

References

Crocidura
Endemic fauna of Indonesia
Mammals of Sulawesi
Taxa named by Ned Hollister
Taxa named by Gerrit Smith Miller Jr.
Mammals described in 1921
Taxonomy articles created by Polbot